is the ninth single of the J-pop idol group Morning Musume, released on May 17, 2000. It sold a total of 990,950 copies, becoming a number-one hit in Japan.

History
This also marks the last single of Sayaka Ichii and the debut of the "Fourth Generation" Morning Musume members Rika Ishikawa, Hitomi Yoshizawa, Nozomi Tsuji and Ai Kago. This is their first 12 cm CD single.

Track listing 
  – 4:50
  – 4:32
  – 4:46

Members at time of single 
1st generation: Yuko Nakazawa, Kaori Iida, Natsumi Abe
2nd generation: Kei Yasuda, Mari Yaguchi, Sayaka Ichii 
3rd generation: Maki Goto
4th generation : Rika Ishikawa, Hitomi Yoshizawa, Nozomi Tsuji, Ai Kago

References

External links 
 Happy Summer Wedding entry on the Up-Front Works official website

Morning Musume songs
Zetima Records singles
2000 singles
Oricon Weekly number-one singles
Song recordings produced by Tsunku
2000 songs
Songs written by Tsunku